Myosotis afropalustris is a species of plant in the family of Boraginaceae. They can be found in South Africa (Free State, KwaZulu-Natal, E-Cape Prov.), and Lesotho. M. afropalustris is not endemic to South Africa.

References

afropalustris
Flora of Lesotho
Flora of the Free State
Flora of KwaZulu-Natal
Flora of the Cape Provinces